Rhys McCabe (born 24 July 1992) is a Scottish footballer and coach who plays as a central midfielder, and is the player-manager for Airdrieonians.

McCabe started his senior career with Rangers. McCabe has also played for Dunfermline Athletic, 
Brechin City and Queen of the South  in Scotland, English clubs Sheffield Wednesday and Portsmouth, and Irish clubs Sligo Rovers and St Patrick's Athletic. McCabe has also represented the Scotland national under-21 football team.

Club career

Rangers
A member of Rangers under-19 squad McCabe scored in the Youth Cup Final in April 2011 in what was ultimately a 2–1 defeat to Celtic. In July 2011 he made his first team debut as a substitute in a friendly against Blackpool, going on to make subsequent appearances in friendlies against Liverpool and Hamburg. He signed a contract extension in December 2011 extending his stay with the club to 2015. Having been an unused substitute in nine previous fixtures that season, he made his Scottish Premier League debut on 3 March 2012, playing the full 90 minutes in a 2–1 defeat to Hearts. On 25 March he made his Old Firm debut in a 3–2 win over Celtic.

Sheffield Wednesday
He then signed a three-year contract with Sheffield Wednesday. On 11 October 2012 Sheffield Wednesday agreed an undisclosed settlement with Rangers. His first goal for Sheffield Wednesday was an edge of the box screamer from a corner against Charlton Athletic on 22 December 2012. The goal was subsequently voted goal of the day on Sky Sports News. He scored his second goal for the club in a League Cup tie against Rotherham United.

On 17 March 2014, McCabe joined League Two club Portsmouth on loan for the rest of the 2013–14 season. He was recalled early from his loan spell by The Owls on 24 April 2014. McCabe was released along with 10 other players from his contract at the end of the 2014–15 season.

Dunfermline Athletic
After his release, McCabe was reported as having attracted the interest of a number of clubs in his native Scotland. Following trials with St Johnstone and Hibernian, McCabe signed for Scottish League One side Dunfermline Athletic in September 2015 making his debut as a first half substitute in a 5–0 victory against Stenhousemuir, one day after signing for the club as. His first goal for the Pars came against Albion Rovers, after an error from Rovers keeper Ross M. Stewart saw McCabe's long-range effort punched into the goal.

Sligo Rovers
On 7 June 2017, McCabe agreed to sign for League of Ireland Premier Division club Sligo Rovers during the July transfer window, following the end of his contract with Dunfermline Athletic.

St Patrick's Athletic
On 23 January 2019, it was announced that McCabe had signed for St Patrick's Athletic alongside Chris Forrester who signed from Aberdeen. It was announced on 6 November 2019 that McCabe was released, following the end of his contract with the Saints which whom he played for 27 times over the season, scoring once.

Brechin City
In January 2020, McCabe signed a six-month contract with Brechin City.

Queen of the South
On 24 August 2020, McCabe signed a one-year contract with Queen of the South until 31 May 2021.

On 23 January 2021, McCabe captained the club in the absence of Stephen Dobbie captain and Gregor Buchanan vice captain through injury, as Queens won 2-1 versus Greenock Morton at Palmerston.

Airdrieonians
On 11 June 2021, McCabe signed a one-year contract with Airdrieonians in Scottish League One.

On 26 May 2022, following the departure of manager Ian Murray, McCabe was announced as the player-manager of Airdrieonians.

International career
McCabe made his debut for the Scotland national under-21 football team in April 2012.

Personal life
McCabe's cousin Callum Fordyce is also a professional footballer; the two play together at Airdrieonians and previously played alongside each other at Dunfermline Athletic. Shelley Kerr, the former Scotland Women's manager is his aunt.

Career statistics

Honours

Club
Dunfermline Athletic
Scottish League One: 2015–16

Managerial statistics

References

External links

1992 births
Living people
Footballers from West Lothian
People from Polbeth
Scottish footballers
Scotland under-21 international footballers
Association football midfielders
Rangers F.C. players
Sheffield Wednesday F.C. players
Portsmouth F.C. players
Dunfermline Athletic F.C. players
Sligo Rovers F.C. players
St Patrick's Athletic F.C. players
Brechin City F.C. players
Queen of the South F.C. players
Airdrieonians F.C. players
Scottish Premier League players
English Football League players
League of Ireland players
Expatriate association footballers in the Republic of Ireland
Airdrieonians F.C. managers
Scottish Professional Football League managers
Scottish football managers